What Men Want is a 1930 American pre-Code drama film directed by Ernst Laemmle and starring Pauline Starke, Ben Lyon, Hallam Cooley, Barbara Kent, Robert Ellis and Carmelita Geraghty. (All three credited actresses were WAMPAS Baby Stars.) Written by John B. Clymer and Dorothy Yost, the film was released on July 13, 1930, by Universal Pictures.

Plot
Lee Joyce tells her lover, Howard LeMoyne, that she is actually in love with another man, Kendall James. As soon as her breakup happens, Lee's younger sister Betty turns up and Kendall becomes infatuated with her instead. In anger, Lee shatters her sister's romance by revealing her previous affair with Kendall, after which Lee tries to return to Howard.

Cast 
Pauline Starke as Lee Joyce
Ben Lyon as Kendall James
Hallam Cooley as Bunch
Barbara Kent as Betty 'Babs' Joyce
Robert Ellis as Howard LeMoyne
Carmelita Geraghty as Mabel

References

External links 
 

1930 films
American drama films
1930 drama films
Universal Pictures films
American black-and-white films
Films directed by Ernst Laemmle
1930s English-language films
1930s American films